Hafele is a surname. Notable people with the surname include:

 Anna Häfele (born 1989), German ski jumper
 Joseph C. Hafele (1933–2014), American physicist
 Mathias Hafele (born 1983), Austrian former ski jumper